Saturday Night (Spanish: La noche del sábado) is a 1950 Spanish drama film directed by Rafael Gil and starring María Félix, Rafael Durán and José María Seoane. It is a film adaptation of the 1918 play of the same name, Saturday Night: A Novel For The Stage In Five Tableaux by playwright Jacinto Benavente.
The film's sets were designed by Enrique Alarcón.

Plot 
In Rome, the sculptor Leonardo Alfieri hires a beautiful dancer to make a statue that he hopes will be his masterpiece. The work causes a sensation throughout the country and draws the attention of Prince Florencio, heir to the Preslavian throne. Finally, the girl, dazzled by the possibility of leaving poverty behind, leaves everything, including her own daughter, to go with the prince.

Cast

 María Félix as Imperia  
 Rafael Durán  as Príncipe Miguel  
 José María Seoane as Leonardo  
 Manolo Fábregas as Príncipe Florencio  
 María Rosa Salgado as Donina  
 Virgilio Teixeira as Nunú  
 Mariano Asquerino as Harrison 
 Juan Espantaleón as Precepto de Preslavia  
 Julia Delgado Caro as Majestad 
 Luis Hurtado as Dueño del garito  
 María Asquerino as Condesa  
 Manuel Kayser as Padre de Imperia  
 Diego Hurtado as Amigo de Nunú  
 José Prada as Sirviente  
 Fernando Aguirre as Fotógrafo  
 Fernando Fernán Gómez as Director de orquesta  
 Manuel Aguilera as Hombre en bar  
 Francisco Bernal as Hombre en bar 
 Antonio Fraguas 
 Manuel Rosellón 
 Carmen Sánchez
 José Vivó

References

Bibliography
 Mira, Alberto. Historical Dictionary of Spanish Cinema. Scarecrow Press, 2010.

External links 

1950 films
1950 drama films
Spanish drama films
1950s Spanish-language films
Films directed by Rafael Gil
Suevia Films films
Films produced by Cesáreo González
Spanish black-and-white films
1950s Spanish films